Spain participated in the Eurovision Song Contest 2000 with an entry selected through a national preselection called Eurocanción 2000. It was the first national final organized by Televisión Española (TVE) since 1979. Serafín Zubiri, who had already participated for Spain in the Eurovision Song Contest 1992, was the winner with the song "Colgado de un sueño". The song was composed by José María Purón, composer of the Spanish entry that finished second in the 1995 Contest, "Vuelve conmigo". At Eurovision, Serafín Zubiri finished 18th with 18 points.

Before Eurovision

Eurocanción 2000 
The final took place on 8 February 2000 at TVE's studios in Madrid, hosted by Carlos Lozano and Paloma Lago. TVE selected 15 songs internally for the national final.

The winner was decided by a combination of 17 regional juries (70%) and televoting (30%). Each jury awarded points from 1 to 10, then the televoting results of the Spanish public were added to the top 3 songs only. Serafín Zubiri got the highest number of points from the jury and the audience and was proclaimed winner and entrant for Spain at the Eurovision Song Contest 2000.

Apart from Serafín Zubiri, Anabel Conde, who finished second in the Eurovision Song Contest 1995, participated in the contest in a duo with David Domínguez.

At Eurovision
At Eurovision, Zubiri performed 13th. At the close of the voting he had received 18 points, placing 18th of 24.

Voting

References

2000
Countries in the Eurovision Song Contest 2000
Eurovision
Eurovision